The left colic vein drains the descending colon.  It is a tributary of the inferior mesenteric vein, and follows the path of its corresponding artery, the left colic artery.

Branches
 Ascending branch
 Descending branch

References

Veins of the torso